Robert Francis Vaughn (November 22, 1932 – November 11, 2016) was an American actor noted for his stage, film and television work. His television roles include  the spy Napoleon Solo in the 1960s series The Man from U.N.C.L.E.; the detective Harry Rule in the 1970s series The Protectors; Morgan Wendell in the 1978–1979 miniseries Centennial; General Hunt Stockwell in the fifth season of the 1980s series The A-Team; and grifter and card sharp Albert Stroller in the British television drama series Hustle (2004–2012), for all but one of its 48 episodes. He also appeared in the British soap opera Coronation Street as Milton Fanshaw from January until February 2012.

In film, he portrayed the gunman Lee in The Magnificent Seven with Yul Brynner and Steve McQueen, Major Paul Krueger in The Bridge at Remagen with George Segal and Ben Gazzara, the voice of Proteus IV, the computer villain of Demon Seed, Walter Chalmers in Bullitt with Steve McQueen, Ross Webster in Superman III with Christopher Reeve, General Woodbridge in The Delta Force with Lee Marvin, and war veteran Chester A. Gwynn in The Young Philadelphians with Paul Newman, which earned him a 1959 Academy Award nomination for Best Supporting Actor.

Early life
Robert Vaughn was born on November 22, 1932, in New York City, to Gerald Walter Vaughn, a radio actor, and his wife, Marcella Frances (Gaudel), a stage actress. His parents divorced, and Vaughn lived with his grandparents in Minneapolis while his mother traveled and performed.

After high school, he enrolled in the University of Minnesota as a journalism major. However, he dropped out after a year and moved to Los Angeles with his mother. He studied at Los Angeles City College, then transferred to Los Angeles State College of Applied Arts and Sciences, earning a master's degree in theater. After graduating from college, Vaughn was drafted into the Army, serving as a drill sergeant. He later received a Ph.D. in communications from the University of Southern California in 1970. In 1972, he published his dissertation as the book Only Victims: A Study of Show Business Blacklisting.

Career
Vaughn made his television debut on the November 21, 1955, "Black Friday" episode of the American television series Medic, the first of more than two hundred episodic roles through mid-2000. His first film appearance was as an extra in The Ten Commandments (1956), playing a golden calf idolater also visible in a scene in a chariot behind that of Yul Brynner.  In 1956, Vaughn made his first guest appearance on Gunsmoke in the episode entitled “Cooter.” The following year, he made his second guest appearance on Gunsmoke opposite Barbara Eden in a Romeo-Juliet role, in the episode "Romeo", which turned out okay for the bride and groom.

Vaughn's first credited movie role came the following year in the Western Hell's Crossroads (1957), in which he played Bob Ford, the murderer of outlaw Jesse James. Seen by Burt Lancaster in Calder Willingham's play End as a Man, Vaughn was signed with Lancaster's film company and was to have played the Steve Dallas role in Sweet Smell of Success. Vaughn appeared as Stan Gray in the episode "The Twisted Road" of the western syndicated series Frontier Doctor.

Vaughn's first notable appearance was in The Young Philadelphians (1959), receiving a nomination for both the Academy Award for Best Supporting Actor and the Golden Globe Award for Best Supporting Actor – Motion Picture. He next appeared as gunman Lee in The Magnificent Seven (1960), a role he essentially reprised 20 years later in Battle Beyond the Stars (1980), both films adapted from filmmaker Akira Kurosawa's 1954 Japanese samurai epic, Seven Samurai. Vaughn was the last surviving member of those who portrayed The Magnificent Seven. He played a different role, Judge Oren Travis, on the 1998–2000 syndicated television series The Magnificent Seven.

In 1963 Vaughn appeared in an episode of The Dick Van Dyke Show as Jim Darling, a successful businessman and an old flame of Laura Petrie in the episode "It's A Shame She Married Me".  During the 1963–64 season of The Lieutenant, Vaughn appeared as Captain Raymond Rambridge alongside Gary Lockwood, who played a Marine second lieutenant at Camp Pendleton. Vaughn had guest-starred on Lockwood's 1961–62 series Follow the Sun.

His dissatisfaction with the somewhat diminished aspect of the Rambridge character led Vaughn to request an expanded role. During the conference, his name came up in a telephone call and he ended up being offered a series of his own—as Napoleon Solo, title character in a series originally to be called Solo, but which became The Man from U.N.C.L.E. after the pilot was reshot with Leo G. Carroll in the role of Solo's boss. This was the role which would make Vaughn a household name even behind the Iron Curtain. 

From 1964 to 1968, Vaughn played Solo with Scottish co-star David McCallum playing his fellow agent, Illya Kuryakin. This production spawned a spinoff show, large amounts of merchandising, overseas theatrical movies of re-edited episodes, and a sequel, The Return of the Man from U.N.C.L.E.: The Fifteen-Years-Later Affair. After the series ended, Vaughn landed a major film role playing Walter Chalmers, a U.S. Senator in the film Bullitt starring Steve McQueen; he was nominated for a BAFTA Award for Best Supporting Actor for this role.

In 1966, Vaughn appeared as a bachelor on the nighttime premiere of The Dating Game. He was picked for the date, which was a trip to London. After The Man from U.N.C.L.E  was cancelled in 1968, Vaughn continued to appear on television and in mostly B movies. A notable exception is his appearance in The Towering Inferno.

He starred in two seasons of the British detective series The Protectors in the early 1970s. He also appeared in two episodes of Columbo during the mid-1970s, "Troubled Waters" (1975) and "Last Salute to the Commodore" (1976). The latter episode is one of the few in the series where the identity of the murderer is not known until the end. Vaughn won an Emmy for his portrayal of Frank Flaherty in Washington: Behind Closed Doors (ABC, 1977) and during the 1980s starred with friend George Peppard in the final season of The A-Team. Vaughn played Morgan Wendell, opponent to Paul Garrett played by David Janssen in the 1978–79 miniseries Centennial.

Vaughn portrayed Presidents Franklin D. Roosevelt and Harry S. Truman, in addition to Woodrow Wilson (in the 1979 television mini-series Backstairs at the White House). He additionally played Roosevelt in the 1982 HBO telefilm FDR: That Man in the White House. In 1983, he starred as villainous multi millionaire Ross Webster in Superman III. In 1983–1984, he appeared as industrialist Harlan Adams in the short-lived series Emerald Point N.A.S., replacing Patrick O'Neal. In the mid-1990s, he made several cameo appearances on Late Night with Conan O'Brien as an audience member who berates the host and his guests beginning with "you people make me sick."

After a string of guest roles on series such as Law & Order (in which he had a recurring role during season eight as Carl Anderton, a wealthy businessman who vows revenge on the NYC DA's office and longtime friend Adam Schiff for sending his grandson to juvenile correction for murdering his stepsister), Vaughn experienced a resurgence in 2004. He began co-starring in the British TV drama series Hustle, made for BBC One. The series was also broadcast in the United States on the cable network AMC. In the series, Vaughn played elder-statesman American con artist Albert Stroller, a father figure to a group of younger grifters. In September 2006, he guest-starred on an episode of Law & Order: Special Victims Unit.

Vaughn also appeared as himself narrating and being a character in a radio play broadcast by BBC Radio 4 in 2007 about making the film The Bridge at Remagen in Prague, during the Russian invasion of 1968. In November 2011, it was announced that Vaughn would appear for three weeks in the British soap opera Coronation Street. His role as Milton in the long-running program lasted from January to February 2012.

In later years, Vaughn appeared in syndicated advertisements marketed by Commercial Pro, Inc. for various personal injury and workers compensation law firms, using the catchphrase, "Tell them you mean business".

Personal life

Vaughn married actress Linda Staab in 1974. They appeared together in a 1973 episode of The Protectors, called "It Could Be Practically Anywhere on the Island". They adopted two children, Cassidy (born 1976) and Caitlin (born 1981). They resided in Ridgefield, Connecticut.

During the late 1960s Joyce Jameson was a girlfriend of Vaughn's.  She acted opposite Vaughn as a guest star on a 1966 U.N.C.L.E. episode "The Dippy Blond Affair".

For many years, it was believed Vaughn was the biological father of English film director and producer Matthew Vaughn, born when the actor was in a relationship with early 1970s socialite Kathy Ceaton. However, a paternity investigation identified the father as George de Vere Drummond, an English aristocrat and godson of King George VI. Early in Matthew's life, Vaughn asked for the child's surname to be Vaughn, which Matthew continues to use professionally.

Political views
Vaughn was a longtime member of the Democratic Party. His family was also Democratic and was involved in politics in Minneapolis. Early in his career, he was described as a "liberal Democrat". He was opposed to the Hollywood Blacklist of suspected Communists on freedom of speech principles, but Vaughn also was opposed to Communism as a totalitarian system. Vaughn campaigned for John F. Kennedy in the Presidential election of 1960 for U.S. President. He was the chair of the California Democratic State Central Committee speakers bureau and actively campaigned for candidates in the 1960s. 

Vaughn was the first popular American actor to take a public stand against the Vietnam War and was active in the peace group Another Mother for Peace. Vaughn debated with William F. Buckley Jr. on his program Firing Line on the Vietnam War. With Dick Van Dyke and Carl Reiner, he was a founder of Dissenting Democrats. Early in the 1968 presidential election, they supported the candidacy of Minnesota Senator Eugene McCarthy, who was running for president as an alternative to Vice President Hubert Humphrey, who had supported President Lyndon Johnson's escalation of the war in Vietnam.

Vaughn was reported to have political ambitions of his own, but in a 1973 interview, he denied having had any political aspirations. In a conversation with historian Jack Sanders, he stated that after the assassination of Robert F. Kennedy in 1968, "I lost heart for the battle."

Books
Vaughn published Only Victims: A Study of Show Business Blacklisting in 1972. His second book, A Fortunate Life, was published in 2008.

Death
Vaughn died in a hospice in Danbury, Connecticut,
on November 11, 2016, eleven days before his 84th birthday, after a year-long treatment for leukaemia.

Theatre

Filmography

Film

Television

References

Sources

External links

 
 
 
 
 
 
 Obituary: Robert Vaughn—BBC News; first published November 11, 2016
 Robert Vaughn (Aveleyman)

1932 births
2016 deaths
20th-century American male actors
21st-century American male actors
American anti–Vietnam War activists
American male film actors
American male radio actors
American male stage actors
American male television actors
American male voice actors
American memoirists
Connecticut Democrats
Deaths from cancer in Connecticut
Deaths from leukemia
Los Angeles State College alumni
Los Angeles City College alumni
Male actors from Connecticut
Male actors from Minneapolis
Male actors from New York City
Minnesota Democrats
New York (state) Democrats
Outstanding Performance by a Supporting Actor in a Drama Series Primetime Emmy Award winners
People from Ridgefield, Connecticut
University of Minnesota School of Journalism and Mass Communication alumni
University of Southern California alumni
Western (genre) television actors
United States Army soldiers